The house-museum of Mirza Alakbar Sabir is a memorial museum dedicated to the Azerbaijani satirical poet, public figure, philosopher and teacher, Mirza Alakbar Sabir. The museum is located in Shamakhi.

History

The museum was established in 1962, in connection with the 100th anniversary of birth of the poet. The museum is located in a two-storeyed building. The former building of the museum consisted of one floor and 2 exposition halls. The museum was in an emergency condition. It was demolished and rebuilt in 1978. Following the reconstruction, it was reopened 1979 as a museum for public. In September, 2017, the museum was closed and disassembled for restoration, because of wreck of a wall of the museum.

Exhibition
Total area of the museum is 293 m2. The museum consists of six exhibition halls, a balcony. In the first exposition hall exhibits of childhood M.A.Sabir, his school years, exhibits of his travels, and a model of his pot he used to cook soap are displayed. In other rooms household items belonging to the XIX-XX centuries, gifts donated to the museum, photos of Sabir's contemporaries, works of researchers, examples of Molla Nasraddin magazine and other exhibits are exhibited to the audience.

References

Biographical museums in Azerbaijan
Museums established in 1962